Pyrgiscus is a genus of sea snails, marine gastropod mollusks in the subfamily Turbonillinae of the family Pyramidellidae, the pyrams and their allies.

Species
Species within the genus Pyrgiscus include:

 † Pyrgiscus abjunctus Laws, 1937 
 Pyrgiscus abrardi (Fischer-Piette & Nicklès, 1946)
 † Pyrgiscus adeps (Laws, 1937) 
 Pyrgiscus alacer Saurin, 1959
 Pyrgiscus altenai van Aartsen & Corgan, 1996
 Pyrgiscus amicitia (Nomura, 1936)
 Pyrgiscus asmundinus (Saurin, 1959)
 Pyrgiscus aureocinctus (Kuroda & Habe, 1971)
 Pyrgiscus basicinctus (Saurin, 1959)
 Pyrgiscus bisculptus (Nomura, 1937)
 Pyrgiscus bona (Nomura, 1937)
 Pyrgiscus boninensis (Nomura, 1939)
 Pyrgiscus brevis (Nomura, 1936)
 † Pyrgiscus caribbaeus Landau & LaFollette, 2015 
 Pyrgiscus cedrosus (Dall, 1884)
 † Pyrgiscus chattonensis (Marwick, 1929) 
 Pyrgiscus crassus Saurin, 1959
 Pyrgiscus crenatus (Brown, 1827)
 Pyrgiscus crystallopectus  (Melvill, 1910)
 Pyrgiscus dawydoffi (Saurin, 1959)
 Pyrgiscus dongkhanhi (Saurin, 1959)
 Pyrgiscus eminutus (de Folin, 1878)
 Pyrgiscus erica (Thiele, 1925)
 Pyrgiscus eumenes  (Melvill, 1910)
 Pyrgiscus feraudi (Saurin, 1959)
 † Pyrgiscus festivus (Marwick, 1943) 
 Pyrgiscus gracilentus (Nomura, 1936)
 † Pyrgiscus hampdenensis (R. S. Allan, 1926) 
 Pyrgiscus hataianus (Nomura, 1937)
 Pyrgiscus hebridarum (Peñas & Rolán, 2010)
 Pyrgiscus inaequistriatus (Saurin, 1959)
 Pyrgiscus infantilis Saurin, 1958
 Pyrgiscus infelix (Thiele, 1925)
 † Pyrgiscus intextus (Marwick, 1931) 
 Pyrgiscus irma (Thiele, 1925)
 Pyrgiscus jeffreysii (Jeffreys, 1848)
 Pyrgiscus kotorai (Nomura, 1936)
 Pyrgiscus mabutii (Nomura, 1938)
 † Pyrgiscus macphersoni (Marwick, 1931) 
 Pyrgiscus massui (Saurin, 1959)
 Pyrgiscus matsunamiensis (Otuka, 1935)
 Pyrgiscus miyakoensis (Nomura, 1939)
 Pyrgiscus mourazimanus (Nomura, 1938)
 Pyrgiscus nagarinus Saurin, 1959
 Pyrgiscus ninettae van Aartsen & Corgan, 1996
 Pyrgiscus optimus (Nomura, 1936)
 Pyrgiscus optivus (Nomura, 1937)
 Pyrgiscus otakauicus (Laws, 1937)
 † Pyrgiscus otoconsors (Laws, 1937) 
 Pyrgiscus pacificus (Yokoyama, 1922)
 Pyrgiscus pellucidus (Saurin, 1959)
 Pyrgiscus plebeia (Nomura, 1936)
 Pyrgiscus prolongatus (W.H. Turton, 1932)
 Pyrgiscus quangae Saurin, 1959
 Pyrgiscus renatae (Saurin, 1959)
 Pyrgiscus rufescens (Forbes, 1846)
 Pyrgiscus rufus (Philippi, 1836)
 Pyrgiscus semistriata (Saurin, 1962)
 Pyrgiscus siamensis (Saurin, 1962)
 † Pyrgiscus silvai Landau & LaFollette, 2015 
 Pyrgiscus speciosus (A. Adams, 1860)
 Pyrgiscus tabulae (Saurin, 1962)
 Pyrgiscus taiaroa (Laws, 1937)
 Pyrgiscus tateyamaensis (Nomura, 1938)
 Pyrgiscus tefunta (Bartsch, 1915)
 Pyrgiscus thielei van Aartsen & Corgan, 1996
 Pyrgiscus thuanae (Saurin, 1959)
 Pyrgiscus umemotoi (Nomura, 1938)
 Pyrgiscus vannieri Saurin, 1959
 † Pyrgiscus waihaoicus (P. A. Maxwell, 1992) 
 Pyrgiscus yoritomoi (Nomura, 1938)
 Pyrgiscus yoshikoae Hori & Fukuda, 1999
 Pyrgiscus yoshisadai (Nomura, 1938)
 Pyrgiscus yotukurensis (Nomura, 1938)
 Pyrgiscus yvonnae (Saurin, 1959)
 Pyrgiscus zinboi (Nomura, 1936)

The following species were brought into synonymy
 Pyrgiscus aulicus (Dall & Bartsch, 1906): synonym of Turbonilla aulica Dall & Bartsch, 1906
 Pyrgiscus bisculpta [sic]: synonym of Pyrgiscus bisculptus (Nomura, 1937)
 Pyrgiscus bowensis [sic]: synonym of Turbonilla bowenensis Laseron, 1959
 † Pyrgiscus discors P. A. Maxwell, 1988 : synonym of † Turriscala discors (P. A. Maxwell, 1988)
 Pyrgiscus erna (Thiele, 1925): synonym of Pyrgiscus thielei van Aartsen & Corgan, 1996 (Invalid: based on junior homonym of Turbonilla erna Bartsch, 1915; Pyrgiscus thielei is a replacement name)
 Pyrgiscus flexicosta Laseron, 1951: synonym of Turbonilla flexicosta (Laseron, 1951)
 Pyrgiscus fulvizonatus  (Melvill, 1910): synonym of Turbonilla fulvizonata Nomura, 1938
 Pyrgiscus gravicosta Laseron, 1951: synonym of Turbonilla gravicosta (Laseron, 1951)
 Pyrgiscus hataiana [sic]: synonym of Pyrgiscus hataianus (Nomura, 1937)
 Pyrgiscus hedleyi Laseron, 1951: synonym of Turbonilla hedleyi (Laseron, 1951)
 Pyrgiscus infans Laseron, 1951: synonym of Graphis infans (Laseron, 1951) (original combination)
 Pyrgiscus microscopica (Laseron, 1959): synonym of Turbonilla mumia (A. Adams, 1861)
 Pyrgiscus mirandus Saurin, 1959: synonym of Turbonilla funiculata de Folin, 1868
 Pyrgiscus mumia (A. Adams, 1861): synonym of Turbonilla mumia (A. Adams, 1861)
 Pyrgiscus optima [sic]: synonym of Pyrgiscus optimus (Nomura, 1936)
 Pyrgiscus pacifica [sic]: synonym of Pyrgiscus pacificus (Yokoyama, 1922)
 Pyrgiscus pinguis Laseron, 1951: synonym of Turbonilla pinguis (Laseron, 1951)
 Pyrgiscus sumneri (Bartsch, 1909): synonym of Turbonilla sumneri Bartsch, 1909

References

 Robba, E. (2013). Tertiary and Quaternary fossil pyramidelloidean gastropods of Indonesia. Scripta Geologica. 144: 1-191. 
 Landau B.M. & LaFollette P.I. (2015). The Pyramidellidae (Mollusca: Gastropoda) from the Miocene Cantaure Formation of Venezuela. Cainozoic Research. 15(1-2): 13-54.

External links
 To World Register of Marine Species
 Philippi R.A. (1841). Zoologische Bemerkungen. Archiv für Naturgeschichte, Berlin : 7(1): 42-59; pl. 5
 Monterosato, T. A. di. (1884). Nomenclatura generica e specifica di alcune conchiglie mediterranee. Virzi, printed for the Author, Palermo, 152 pp.
 Laws C.R. 1937. Review of the Tertiary and Recent Neozelanic Pyramidellid Molluscs. No. 3 — Further Turbonillid Genera. Transactions and Proceedings of the Royal Society of New Zealand, 67: 166-184, pl. 34-35
 Arnold, R. (1903). The Paleontology and Stratigraphy of the Marine Pliocene and Pleistocene of San Pedro, California. Memoirs of the California Academy of Sciences. 3: 1-420

Pyramidellidae